The arc-eye hawkfish (Paracirrhites arcatus), the ringeye hawkfish, horseshoe hawkfish or whiteline hawkfish, is a species of marine ray-finned fish, a hawkfish belonging to the family Cirrhitidae. It is found in shallow waters in the tropical Indo-Pacific on reefs, resting on coral heads much of the time.

Taxonomy
The arc-eye hawkfish was first formally described in 1829 as Cirrhites arcatus by the French zoologist Georges Cuvier with the type locality given as Mauritius. The specific name arcatus means “arched”, an allusion which Cuvier did not explain but it may refer to the horseshoe shaped mark behind the eye. Some authorities treat Paracirrhites amblycephalus as a valid species but Fishbase treats this taxon as a synonym of P. arcatus.

Description

The arc-eye hawkfish has a relatively deep body, the standard length being around 2.7 times its length. It has a smooth upper preopercular margin and a slightly rounded to truncate caudal fin. The dorsal fin contains 10 spines and 11 soft rays while the anal fin has 3 spines and 6 soft rays, each dorsal fin spine being tipped with a branched cirrus. This species has a variable background colour on the body, the typical colour being pale pinkish brown. There is a horseshoe-shaped mark to the rear of the eye that consists of three thin lines. The gill cover has three orange bands set in a light blue area. A white to pink stripe is frequently present from around halfway along the flank and running to the rear.

Distribution and habitat
The arc-eye hawkfish is widespread in the tropical Indo-Pacific. Its range extends from is from East Africa from southern Somalia to South Africa eastwards across the Indian Ocean into the Pacific Ocean east to the Hawaiian Islands and Pitcairn Islands, north to Japan and south to Australia. In Australia it has been recorded from off Shark Bay to the Muiron Islands and offshore reefs of Western Australia, at Ashmore Reef in the Timor Sea, and from the northern Great Barrier Reef and reefs in the Coral Sea south to the Solitary Islands in New South Wales. It has also been recorded at the Australian Indian Ocean territories of Christmas Island and the Cocos (Keeling) Islands; and the Tasman Sea locations of Middleton Reef, Elizabeth Reef and Norfolk Island. It is a benthic species associated with coral reefs.

Biology
The arc-eye hawkfish is typically seen sitting motionless on the reef amongst corals. It prefers the heads of Pocillopora, Stylophora and Acropora corals and is solitary. It preys mostly on shrimps, small fishes, crabs, and other crustaceans. There are main colour morphs and these occur together with the darker fish on basalt dominated areas and the pale fish on corals, the different fish frequently being only a few metres from each other. They form pairs to spawn, the pair ascending into the water column to release their gametes.

Utilisation
The arc-eye hawkfish is collected for, and is a relatively common species in, the aquarium trade.

References

 
 Anonym, 2000. Data base of J.L.B. Smith Institute of Ichthyology, Grahamstown, South Africa. J.L.B. Smith Institute of Ichthyology, Grahamstown, South Africa.
 Anonym, 2001. Data base of National Museum of Natural History (Smithsonian Institution). Smithsonian Institution - Division of Fishes.
 Anonym, 2002. Data base of American Museum of Natural History. American Museum of Natural History, Central Park West, NY 10024–5192, United States.
 Gibbons, S., 1999. Collect fish on stamps. Stanley Gibbons Ltd., London i Ringwood. 418 p.
 Munz, F.W. i W.N. McFarland, 1973. The significance of spectral position in the rhodopsins of tropical marine fishes. Vision Res.13:1829-1874. 
 Randall, J.E., 1986. Cirrhitidae. P. 664–666. A: M.M. Smith i P.C. Heemstra (eds.). Smiths' sea fishes. Springer-Verlag, Berlín. 
 Robins, C.R., R.M. Bailey, C.E. Bond, J.R. Brooker, E.A. Lachner, R.N. Lea i W.B. Scott, 1991. World fishes important to North Americans. Exclusive of species from the continental waters of the United States and Canada. Am. Fish. Soc. Spec. Publ. (21):243 p.
 Wheeler, A., 1977. Das grosse Buch der Fische. Eugen Ulmer GmbH & Co. Stuttgart. 356 p.
 Wu, H.L., K.-T. Shao i C.F. Lai (eds.), 1999. Latin-Chinese dictionary of fishes names. The Sueichan Press, Taiwan.

External links

 BioLib
 Barcodes of Life
 NCBI
 AQUATAB
 Animal Diversity Web
 Encyclopedia of Life
 World Register of Marine Species
 ITIS
 UNEP-WCMC Species Database
 

arc-eye hawkfish
Fish of the Pacific Ocean
Fish of Hawaii
Taxa named by Georges Cuvier
arc-eye hawkfish